Rowville Secondary College is a co-educational, public high school, located in Rowville, Victoria, Australia. It is divided into two campuses, the East and the West. The Eastern Campus has students from years 7 to 12 in the Rowville Sports Academy and Rowville Institute of the Arts. The  Western Campus has students from years 7 to 12 in both the Maths and Science Academy and the General Excellence Program. The college started off as one campus but in November 1996 the eastern campus was opened. In 2007, RSC added the Rowville Sports Academy (RSA) to its list of specialist programs. In 2008 Rowville Institute of the Arts (RIA) commenced and 2012 saw the introduction of the third specialist program- the Maths and Science Academy (MSA).

House system
Rowville Secondary College has four school houses which every student and teacher is a part of. They meet with other members of their house every morning, as well as participate in a range of college events representing their house such as Athletics Day.
The four houses are:
Walton (green) - Named after Nancy Bird Walton, a pioneering Australian aviator, founder and patron of the Australian Women Pilots' Association.
Stynes (blue) - Named after Jim Stynes, an AFL footballer and founder of The Reach Foundation, an organisation that works to develop the social and emotional development of young people.
Mabo (yellow) - Named after Eddie Mabo, an indigenous Australian whose landmark case recognised the land rights of the Meriam people, traditional owners of the Murray Islands in the Torres Strait.
Aston (red) - Named after Tilly Aston, a vision impaired Australian writer & teacher who founded the Victorian Association of Braille

Notable alumni 
Paulo Retre - Footballer for the Sydney Football Club

See also
 List of schools in Victoria
 Victorian Certificate of Education

References

External links 
 Rowville Secondary College: Official website

Public high schools in Melbourne
Educational institutions established in 1990
1990 establishments in Australia
Buildings and structures in the City of Knox